Amanita subnudipes is a species of Amanita found in Italy.

References

External links

subnudipes
Fungi of Europe